Patricia McGuire (born 1952) is the 14th president of Trinity Washington University in Washington D.C.; she was appointed president in 1989. She is credited with successfully transitioning the institution from one that primarily served elites and was on the verge of collapse to one that primarily caters to underprivileged students, mostly local black and Hispanic women.

Early life and career
A native of Philadelphia, McGuire graduated from Merion Mercy Academy, in Merion, Pennsylvania. She earned her bachelor of arts degree cum laude in political science from Trinity College, now Trinity Washington University, in 1974 and her law degree from the Georgetown University Law Center in 1977.  McGuire was the Assistant Dean for Development and External Affairs for Georgetown University Law Center, where she was also an adjunct professor of law teaching courses in tax exempt organizations. She also was project director for Georgetown's D.C. Street Law Project as well as a legal affairs commentator for the CBS News children's television newsmagazine 30 Minutes and Washington TV Channel 5’s talk show, Panorama, hosted by Maury Povich.

Trinity presidency
McGuire is credited with the transformation of Trinity. Under her leadership, Trinity has nearly doubled its enrollment, expanded academic programs, completed its first successful capital campaign, became a university in 2004, and built the 2004 Washington Business Journal’s award-winning $20-million Trinity Center for Women and Girls in Sports, a state-of-the-art athletic center.  McGuire has focused on meeting the educational needs of the Washington, D.C., community and today, Trinity educates more D.C. Public School graduates than any other private university in the city and in the nation.

During McGuire’s tenure, Trinity’s institutional accreditation was affirmed in 1996 and 2006 by the Middle States Commission on Higher Education; in 2006 the Visiting Team report noted, “Transformed over the last two decades by dramatic changes and courageous and deliberate embracing of ‘paradigm shift,’ the University has remained remarkably faithful to its rich tradition, the founding vision of the Sisters of Notre Dame de Namur:  the special commitment to women, to the primacy of the liberal arts and to the Catholic intellectual, moral and social justice tradition.”  During McGuire’s presidency, Trinity also secured accreditation from the National Council for Accreditation for Teacher Education (NCATE) for its education programs and from the Commission on Collegiate Nursing Education (CCNE) for Trinity’s RN-to-BSN program.

McGuire also established an academic program at THEARC (Town Hall, Education, Arts and Recreation Campus) in Southeast Washington, making Trinity the only university to offer college degrees east of the Anacostia River in D.C.

Boards and other activities
McGuire is currently a member of the boards of directors of the Greater Washington Board of Trade, the Washington Hospital Center, the Washington Metropolitan Consortium of Universities, the National Defense Intelligence College, the Women’s College Coalition, the UNIFI Mutual Holding Company and Acacia Life Insurance Company, and Goodwill of Greater Washington. She is slated to join the boards of the American Council on Education and United Educators in 2008. She serves on advisory boards and committees of the Girl Scouts of the USA of the Nation’s Capital and the National Postsecondary Education Cooperative of the U.S. Department of Education. Prior service includes the boards of the Eugene and Agnes Meyer Foundation, the National Association of Independent Colleges and Universities, and Elderhostel, as well as vice chair of the Commission on Higher Education of the Middle States Association, and chair of the Commission on Lifelong Learning of the American Council on Education.

In 2006, McGuire served on the independent advisory panel on governance for the American Red Cross. In 2000, D. C. Mayor Anthony Williams and the D.C. Financial Control Board appointed President McGuire to a special term on the Education Advisory Committee overseeing the D.C. Public Schools. In June 1998, Treasury Secretary Robert Rubin appointed McGuire to serve as a member of the first-ever citizens’ advisory panel on coinage, the 8-member Dollar Coin Design Advisory Committee, which recommended the image of Sacagawea for the new dollar coin.

Honors and awards
McGuire holds honorary doctorates from Georgetown University, the College of New Rochelle, and the College of St. Elizabeth. In 2007 the Greater Washington Board of Trade honored McGuire as the “Leader of the Years,” one of only six women ever to receive this annual award from this regional business organization. Washingtonian magazine named her a Washingtonian of the Year in 1993; Washingtonian has also recognized her on lists of the “100 Most Powerful Women in Washington” and “150 Most Powerful People in Washington”. The Washington Business Journal included her among the Women Who Mean Business award recipients in 2006. She has received honors and awards from the Girl Scouts of the Nation's Capital, Gallaudet University, the Ignatian Solidarity Network, Ward 5 in Washington, and other civic and educational organizations.

Testimony, speeches and articles
President McGuire has given testimony before US Senate and House committees on a range of topics in higher education. She writes and speaks on a wide variety of topics concerning higher education and her articles have appeared in The Wall Street Journal, The Washington Post, The Baltimore Sun, Trusteeship, the LA Times and other publications. Unique among presidents in the Washington region, she also maintains a blog on Trinity's website through which she offers commentary on contemporary issues.

References

Selected testimony, speeches and articles
 Campus Communications in the Age of Crisis, The Presidency, The American Council on Education's Magazine for Higher Education Leaders article, Fall 2007
 Report Card on Tax Exemptions and Incentives for Higher Education:  Pass, Fail or Need Improvement?, Tuesday, December 5, 2006 Testimony before the Senate Finance Committee
 Remarks for the Women's History Month Program of the Federal Triangle Partnership, Tuesday, March 14, 2006
 Testimony Before the Council of the District of Columbia Committee on Education, Libraries and Recreation, Concerning Higher Education Financial Assistance, September 22, 2005
 Remarks from Wells College Commencement, May 28, 2005
 Creativity, Innovation, Celebration: The Future of Women's Colleges, Remarks for the Centennial * Convocation of the College of New Rochelle, March 23, 2004
 President McGuire Gives Commencement Speech at Her Alma Mater, Merion Mercy Academy, in Merion, Pennsylvania, June 1, 2003
 Strategic Planning as the Roadmap to Renaissance, Published by the Association of Catholic Colleges and Universities Current Issues in Catholic Higher Education publication, Winter 2003
 Freedom, Justice, Hope: The Witness of the University, Remarks to the Class of 2002 of Georgetown College, Georgetown University Commencement, May 18, 2002
 What to Expect When the Evaluators Arrive.... or... The Seven Deadly Sins of Accreditation Visits, Remarks for Middle States Conference of Chief Academic Officers, March 22, 2002

External links
 Trinity Washington University
 President McGuire’s Blog

C-SPAN Q&A interview with McGuire, March 7, 2010

1952 births
Heads of universities and colleges in the United States
Trinity Washington University alumni
Georgetown University Law Center alumni
Living people